The Salisbury and South Wiltshire Sports Club (also known as the County Ground) is a sports ground in Salisbury, Wiltshire, England, which is used for cricket, football, hockey and other sports.

Cricket 
The first recorded cricket match at the ground was in 1854, when South Wiltshire played an All England Eleven. The ground first hosted Wiltshire County Cricket Club in 1888, however the ground hosted its first Minor Counties Championship match seventeen years later when Wiltshire played Hertfordshire in 1905. The ground next hosted Wiltshire's home matches from 1923 to 1949 and then from 1958 to the present day. The ground has also hosted a single MCCA Knockout Trophy match between Wiltshire and Herefordshire.

The ground has also hosted List A matches.  The first List-A match played on the ground was between Wiltshire and Scotland in the 2000 NatWest Trophy.  The ground has hosted two further List-A matches involving Wiltshire: against Ireland in the 2002 Cheltenham & Gloucester Trophy, and Kent in the 2005 Cheltenham & Gloucester Trophy.

In local domestic cricket, the ground is the home of South Wilts Cricket Club who play in the Southern Premier Cricket League. South Wilts have been playing on the main ground since 1854. The second cricket ground was created in 1984 and Salisbury Wanderers played there from 1984 until 2001 where they folded. Since 2001, the second ground has been home of the club's Third and Fourth XI's.

Football 
During World War Two, the American Armed Forces were stationed on the Sports Grounds, using the grounds as a base due to the proximity of the Salisbury Plain.  The club played on the grounds from 1945 until 1989, when they merged with the Moon F.C and Bemerton Boys F.C to become Bemerton Heath Harlequins. Bemerton Heath Harlequins played on the ground for one year, when in 1990 they moved to their present ground at Western Way. Since then the football pitch has been used for local senior and youth football and rugby matches.

Facilities 
The site has two cricket grounds, an artificial all-weather pitch and a full-size grass football pitch.

The first pavilion, a small one-storey building, was built at the Wilton Road ground in 1955 at a cost of £1,000 to accommodate South Wilts Cricket Club and Bemerton Athletic Football Club. This pavilion was closed in 2012, after a long-running fundraising effort for a new clubhouse was completed. The new clubhouse was built with costs rising to £1.2 million. The current clubhouse is a two-storey building that caters for hockey and football in the winter and cricket in the summer. The clubhouse also caters for all Sports Club events, which range from music events to quiz nights.

External links

Salisbury and South Wiltshire Sports Club on CricketArchive
Salisbury and South Wiltshire Sports Club on Cricinfo

Cricket grounds in Wiltshire
Field hockey venues in England
Salisbury
Sports venues completed in 1854
1854 establishments in England